The Edmonton Pride Festival (commonly known as Edmonton Pride) was an LGBTQ2S+ pride festival, held annually in Edmonton, Alberta, Canada. The event was organized by the Edmonton Pride Festival Society, a non-profit organization, and was previously held in early June each year. Following the cancellation of the Edmonton Pride Festival  in 2019, and the following COVID-19 pandemic in 2020, the Edmonton Pride Festival has not been held from 2018 onwards, with no current plans to relaunch. 

Unlike many pride parades which are held at the end of their associated festival week, Edmonton Pride hosted its parade near the opening of the event. As well, the Edmonton Pride Festival Society frequently chose to designate community groups, rather than individuals, as the grand marshals of its parade; in 2012, the parade was led by the trustees of the Edmonton Public School Board, and in 2013 the event was led by the Pride Centre of Edmonton, the city's main LGBTQ2S+ community centre.

History 

The first Pride celebration in Edmonton was held in 1980, and became a weeklong festival in 1983.

The event has its roots in the protest movement against a police raid on the Pisces Spa, a gay bathhouse, on May 30, 1981. However, unlike Pride Week in Toronto, which also had its roots in police protests against Operation Soap, the parade did not become a regular feature of the event until the early 1990s.

The 2013 festival was opened with the raising of the rainbow flag at CFB Edmonton on June 7, the first time in Canadian history that the flag was flown at a military base. The parade on June 8 followed 102 Avenue between 107 Street and Churchill Square. An estimated 30,000 spectators turned out for the event. Performers at the parade event included singer-songwriters Rae Spoon, Jeffery Straker and Kim Kuzma.

As of 2017, the Edmonton Pride Parade had 50,000 attendees.

On June 9, 2018, a group of protesters from within the community temporarily stopped the parade demanding law enforcement and military members be dis-invited from the parade and future parades due to community experiences of fear and discomfort with the police. After a period of negotiation between the parade organizers and protest organizers, parade organizers agreed to the requests of the protest and issued a statement that it "agreed with the demands, and that police and military members would not march in the parade until the community feels that they have taken the necessary steps for all community members to feel safe with their presence."

The Board of Directors announced on April 10, 2019 that following the results of their vote, the 2019 Edmonton Pride Festival would not go as planned. They cited the "current political and social environment" would prevent them from hosting an enjoyable and safe festival.

References

Pride parades in Canada
Festivals in Edmonton
LGBT in Alberta
1981 establishments in Alberta